The men's hammer throw event at the 2002 World Junior Championships in Athletics was held in Kingston, Jamaica, at National Stadium on 16 and 17 July.  A 6 kg (junior implement) hammer was used.

Medalists

Results

Final
17 July

Qualifications
16 Jul

Group A

Group B

Participation
According to an unofficial count, 24 athletes from 18 countries participated in the event.

References

Hammer throw
Hammer throw at the World Athletics U20 Championships